LPP S.A. is a Polish multinational clothing company headquartered in Gdańsk, Poland, whose activity comprises design, production and distribution of clothing. The company owns five distinct fashion brands: Reserved (the company's flagship store), House, Cropp, Mohito and Sinsay  whose offer is available today in stationary and online stores in nearly 40 markets worldwide.

LPP's sales network consists of more than 2,200 stores, with a total area of over 1.4m m2. The company currently employs over 24,000 people in its offices, distribution network and stores in Europe, Asia and Africa. In 2021, the company generated over PLN 14 billion in revenue and PLN 954 million in profits. LPP SA is listed on the Warsaw Stock Exchange as a part of the WIG20 index and belongs to the MSCI Poland index.

History

1991-2000 
In 1991 in Gdańsk, Marek Piechocki and Jerzy Lubianiec started their activity in the clothing industry. After four years, the company initially operating under the name of PH Mistral s.c. was transformed into LPP (abbreviation of the surnames of its founders - Lubianiec, Piechocki and Partners). In 1997 the office in Shanghai was officially opened. In the late 1990s, the owners of LPP decided to create their first  brand - Reserved - and build their own retail network. The first store of the brand was opened in 1998.

2001-2013 
In 2001, LPP made its début on the Warsaw Stock Exchange. The next two years saw the expansion of Reserved brand to the markets of Central and Eastern Europe. In 2002, the company stores were opened in Russia, Estonia, the Czech Republic, Latvia, and Hungary, and in 2003 in Lithuania, Ukraine and Slovakia. Thanks to the success of the brand, the company expanded its portfolio and opened a Cropp store in Poland in 2004. In the following years the brand was launched in Estonia, Slovakia, and Latvia (2005) as well as in Lithuania, Russia, and the Czech Republic (2006). The years 2007 - 2008 were the period of development of activity on the Romanian and Bulgarian markets. In 2008, LPP opened its Distribution Centre in Pruszcz Gdański. In the same year, LPP took over a Cracow-based company - Artman - owner of House and Mohito brands. Owing to this transaction, LPP became the largest clothing company in Poland and the owner of four brands. In 2013, the company's portfolio was expanded by Sinsay brand.

2014-2019 
In 2014, the company was included in the WIG20 index, and the flagship brand - Reserved - appeared on the German market. In the same year, all LPP products made their debut in Croatia. In the following year, the company expanded into the Middle East. At the end of 2017, the LPP sales network comprised more than 1,700 stores with a total area of 1 million square metres. In 2017, the LPP product office was opened in Warsaw, and Reserved, Cropp and House brands made their débuts in Belarus and Serbia. In 2017 LPP opened a Reserved store on Oxford Street in London. 2018 saw further debuts of LPP stores on new markets, including in Israel, Kazakhstan, and Slovenia. In 2019 the Company opened first stores in Bosnia and Herzegovina and Finland.

Since 2020 
In 2020, the company underwent an accelerated digital transformation in response to the restrictions on stationary trade caused by the COVID-19 pandemic, thereby transforming itself into an omnichannel organisation. The distinction between online and stationary sales was removed, and both channels have been treated as a customer-centric whole. A year later, with the stabilisation of the market, LPP returned to its policy of foreign expansion and, strengthening its position in South-Eastern Europe, opened the first stores of all its brands in North Macedonia. Two years later, following the Russian aggression against Ukraine, LPP took the key decision to cease operations in Russia altogether and sell the subsidiary to a Chinese consortium. As a result of the loss of its second-largest market, the company adopted a new development strategy, which involves further expansion in the central, southern and western parts of Europe and increased sales volumes in the e-commerce channel. In the near future, LPP plans to debut all brands in Albania and open Sinsay stationary stores in Greece and Italy.

Closing business operation in Russia 
On 4 March 2022, LPP suspended all of its business activities on the Russian market alongside many other global companies as a response to the 2022 Russian invasion of Ukraine. As of 2022, Russia remained the second biggest market for the company with approximately 500 stores and a distribution centre located in Russia. On 28 April 2022, LPP sold its Russian subsidiary and close 20-year presence on said market.

Stores and distribution centres 
LPP’s global sourcing network is based on two distribution centres, dedicated to servicing over 1,700 stores worldwide, as well as Fulfillment Centres, supporting the company’s online sales. All logistics processes are designed and managed at the head office level, while the company carries out operations based on its own infrastructure and in cooperation with external partners. 

The company’s first distribution centre in Pruszcz Gdański was launched in 2008 and, through constant modernisation and several expansions, is now one of the largest and most modern distribution centres in Central and Eastern Europe. In 2017, LPP began shipping from its newly opened FC in Stryków near Łódź. As a result of the rapid growth of e-commerce, in 2019 the company opened another warehouse to handle online orders in Romania, and a year later signed a contract to lease warehouse space in Slovakia. Further demand for the expansion of logistics facilities resulted in contracts for further Fulfillment Centres in Pruszcz Gdański and Podkarpacie in 2021. At the same time, the construction of a second distribution centre in Brześć Kujawski also began, and the facility was launched in 2022. Thus, the total warehouse space of all LPP facilities currently amounts to 390,000 m2.

Production 
LPP does not operate its own factories. The clothing of the Group's brands is produced mainly in Asia, but also in Poland and other European countries, including Italy, Portugal, Romania, Bulgaria, and Turkey. Since 1997, the company has had an office in Shanghai, and since 2015 also in the capital of Bangladesh - Dhaka. The employees of the facility are responsible, among others, for the acquisition of suppliers, support for particular stages of production, as well as quality control.

Presence on the Warsaw Stock Exchange 
LPP SA has been listed on the Warsaw Stock Exchange since 2001. At the time of its début, the price per share was PLN 48. In 2014, LPP was included in the WIG20 index of the 20 largest companies listed on the Warsaw Stock Exchange. In the same year, LPP was included in the MSCI index.

Shareholding structure 
According to the company's own data, the number of votes at the General Meeting of Shareholders is as follows:
 Semper Simul Foundation – 60,8%
 Sky Foundation – 7%
 Others – 32,2%

In 2018 the founders of the company, in order to ensure its long-term continuity and avoid the fragmentation of LPP capital in the future, decided to establish a foundation and contribute their shares there. In 2020, the Semper Simul Foundation, which is the majority shareholder of the company, took over the controlling stake of LPP in order to provide stable management of the family business and the implementation of its strategy.

Selected awards and distinctions 
 2001: Puls Biznesu award — Gazele Biznesu [Business Gazelles] for LPP as one of the most dynamically developing companies
 2002: Gazeta Giełdy Parkiet award — Najlepiej Zarządzana Spółka Giełdowa [Best Managed Listed Company]
 2003: Economic Award of the President of the Republic of Poland — Najlepsze Polskie Przedsiębiorstwo [Best Polish Enterprise]
 2004: Dziennik Rzeczpospolita award — Orzeł Rzeczpospolitej [Eagle of the Republic of Poland]
 2004: Central & Eastern European Retailer of the Year
 2008: Dziennik Rzeczpospolita award — Orzeł Rzeczpospolitej [Eagle of the Republic of Poland]
 2008: Puls Biznesu award — Filary Polskiej Gospodarki [Polish Economy Pillars]
 2008: Dziennik Rzeczpospolita award — Ranking Najcenniejszych Polskich Marek [Most Valuable Polish Brands]
 2009: Puls Biznesu Award — Giełdowa Spółka Roku — Relacje Inwestorskie [Listed Company of the Year — Investor Relations]
 2011: Puls Biznesu Award — Giełdowa Spółka Roku [Listed Company of the Year] 1st place in the main ranking, “Kompetencje Zarządu” [“Competence of the Board”] category, “Sukces w 2011 roku” [“Success in 2011”] category
 2012: Gazeta Giełdy Parkiet award — Spółka Roku mWig40 [mWIG40 Company of the Year]
 2013: Forbes magazine award – Diamenty [Diamonds]
 2013: Dziennik Rzeczpospolita award — Dobra Firma [Good Company]
 2014: The Polish Agency for Enterprise Development PARP award — Pracodawca Jutra [Employer of Tomorrow]
 2015: Gazeta Giełda Parkiet award — ranking of companies with the best investor relations — 1st place
 2015: American Forbes magazine award — “Most Innovative Growth Companies”
 2016: Budowa Roku 2015 [Construction of the Year 2015] — the competition is organized by the Ministry of Construction, the Polish Association of Construction Engineers and Technicians and the Main Office for Construction Supervision
 2016: Award of the decade — “Rzeczpospolita” and Deloitte's ranking
 2017: Wprost magazine Ranking 200 Największych Polskich Firm 2017 [Ranking of 200 Biggest Polish Companies 2017]
 2017: Forbes magazine award
 2017: Polska Firma — Międzynarodowy Czempion [Polish Company — International Champion], distinction in the category: Eksporter: Polska Firma Prywatna — duże przedsiębiorstwo [Exporter —Polish Private Company—Large enterprise]
 2018: Dziennik Rzeczpospolita award — Ranking Najcenniejszych Polskich Marek [Most Valuable Polish Brands]: 1st place Reserved, 3rd place House, 4th place Cropp
 2018: 3rd place in Research on investor relations in WIG30 companies according to institutional investors
 2019: Narodowy Sukces [National Success] — During the Congress 590, one of the largest cyclical economic events in Poland, at the gala of Economic Awards of the President of the Republic of Poland, the company received an award in the National Success category.
2020: Digital Excellence competition, recognizing companies making digital transformations, LPP was awarded the Digital Excellence award in the Digital Capabilities category.
2020: Eagle of Innovation - award of the Rzeczpospolita daily.
2020: Green Eagle - the award of the Rzeczpospolita daily
2021: The title of Climate Aware Company in the 3rd edition of the study by the Stock Exchange Issuers Association Reporting Standards Foundation  and Bureau Veritas Polska
2021:CSR Silver Leaf – an award granted by the editors of the Polityka weekly 
 2021:Second place in the general classification of the best WIG20 and mWIG40 listed companies reporting on climate issues: “Climate Strategy Benchmark”
 2021:Title of Best Office in the Tri-City and distinction in the “Innovation and Technology” category in the Office Superstar competition - awards granted by CBRE 
 2021:Puls Biznesu Award – Listed Company of the Year
 2021: The best wig20 index company in the bulls and bears competition
 2022: CSR Golden Leaf  - an award granted by editors of the Polityka weekly 
 2022: CSR Green Leaf - awarded for the first time by Polityka weekly for	implementing solutions with a positive impact on the environment

Production in Asia, supply chain control and ACCORD agreement 
Since 2013, LPP has been systematically working on the implementation of standards for improving safety and working conditions in the clothing industry in Asia. Since 2014, a Code of Conduct has been in force for all suppliers working with LPP. The document takes into account the key provisions of the International Labour Organization conventions and the Universal Declaration of Human Rights and sets out the requirements for suppliers, including, among others, wage policy, prohibition of child labour, voluntary nature of work, freedom of association, occupational health and safety principles. In order to increase supervision over the factories producing for LPP in Bangladesh, in addition to controlling its own inspectors, the company decided to commission an international auditor, SGS, to verify the actual compliance of suppliers in Bangladesh with the Code of Conduct.

In addition, in October 2013, LPP, as the only Polish clothing company, joined the ACCORD Agreement aimed at improving safety in clothing factories in Bangladesh (Accord on Fire and Building Safety in Bangladesh). Thanks to the cooperation and financial support of the signatories of the agreement, a total of more than 1600 Asian production plants and sewing plants were subject to inspection. ACCORD also contributed to the implementation of recovery programmes in more than 90% of the factories (as at the end of 2017). As part of the “Safety Committee Training” programme, one of the key projects of the agreement, by the end of 2017, 882 training courses were conducted in which nearly 1.2 million employees participated.

At the beginning of 2018, LPP signed another 3-year extension of the agreement, the so-called “Transition ACCORD”. Its main objective is to prepare the Bengali government to carry out independent inspections and audits in the factories and to ensure further implementation of measures aimed at sustainable improvement of working conditions. As of 1 September 2021, a new initiative - called the International Accord for Health and Safety in the Textile and Garment Industry (International Accord for short) - was established to replace the existing ACCORD initiative. Its aim is to continue and expand the joint efforts of the signatories of the agreement together with trade unions to ensure safety in garment factories.

LPP as a tax payer 
According to a report by the Ministry of Finance, in 2018, LPP was ranked third among the largest CIT payers in Poland in the commercial sector.

Since 2016, the company has paid a total of PLN 5.4 bn to the state budget for taxes and other tributes, while its contribution to the Polish budget in 2021 alone amounted to nearly 1.6 bn.

CSR and charitable activity 
Since its inception, LPP has been acting for the benefit of people in need and local communities. In addition, in December 2017, LPP established LPP Foundation. The aim of its activities is to support people threatened by social exclusion, help people in difficult life situations and ensure health protection.

Environment policy 
LPP conducts activities aimed at respecting natural resources at various stages of the company's activity — from the selection of raw materials for clothing, through sales, to the operation of the company's offices and logistics facilities.

Selected activities of LPP related to environmental protection
 Introduction of the Eco Aware line consisting of more environmentally friendly materials (organic cotton, TencelTM , Lyocel, EcoVeroTM, certified linen) in collection of the LPP's brands.
 Resignation from natural fur, angora and mohair in the production of clothes.
 Using only RDS or RWS certified down and wool for garments.
 Introduction of recycled cardboard boxes in the online sale of the Reserved and Mohito collections.
 Using recycled film to ship online orders of House, Cropp and Sinsay brands.
 Reduction of electricity consumption in the new LPP stores thanks to the use of modern HVAC and progressive LED lighting.
 Launching a used garments collection programme and donating the clothing to the homeless as part of activities combining aid with care for the environment and giving second life to textiles.
 Joining the New Plastics Economy Global Commitment and committing to eliminate plastic packaging that is no longer usable, recyclable or compostable by 2025.
 Announcement of the new Sustainable Development Strategy "For People for Our Planet" for 2020–2025.
Accession to the Polish Plastic Pact.
Joining the Zero Discharge Hazardous Chemicals global initiative for chemical safety in the clothing industry.
Joining the international	organisation Canopy, which aims to develop best practices for the conservation of forest resources by implementing changes in the	purchasing, packaging and production of pulp fabrics.
Joining the Cotton made in	Africa initiative which promotes sustainable cotton production and support for African farmers.
As the first Polish	company, joining the Science Based Targets Initiative (SBTi) supporting private companies in developing and implementing decarbonisation strategies.

Since 2017, the company has been reporting regularly on its sustainability activities in the form of reports available at https://www.lppsa.com/zrownowazony-rozwoj/raport-roczny. Gradual reduction of its carbon footprint has been adopted as one of the main objectives of its sustainability-oriented activities. To this end, the company calculated its CO2 emissions independently in 2021, taking into account all three scopes and categories defined in the GHG Protocol.

Taking into account the growing importance of non-financial elements of corporate performance, in 2021 LPP adapted its organisational structure by creating the position of Director of Purchasing and ESG. The role’s responsibilities comprise planning and coordinating the implementation of responsible business standards within LPP Group, developing and implementing guidelines in all three ESG pillars: environmental, social and corporate governance.

See also
List of Polish companies
Economy of Poland

References

External links
 

Companies listed on the Warsaw Stock Exchange
Retail companies of Poland
Multinational companies headquartered in Poland
Clothing companies established in 1991
Retail companies established in 1998
Clothing companies of Poland
Companies based in Gdańsk
Polish brands